FC Lokomotyv Donetsk was a football club from Donetsk.

History
The club was created sometime around 1957 and initially represented city of Artemivsk (today Bakhmut). After being promoted to the Soviet Class B in 1958, the club moved to Stalino (Donetsk) in mid-season where it played at a newly built Lokomotyv Stadium (today known as RSC Olimpiyskiy). The club existed until 1973 when it relegated from the Soviet Second League and was dissolved.

References

External links
 All matches of the club.
 Second League (Zone 1) – 1971. ukr-football.org

 
Defunct football clubs in the Soviet Union
Defunct football clubs in Ukraine
Football clubs in Donetsk
Association football clubs established in 1957
Association football clubs disestablished in 1973
1957 establishments in Ukraine
1973 disestablishments in Ukraine
Donetsk 
Lokomotiv (sports society)
Sports team relocations